New Inn is a village in County Tipperary in Ireland. It is also in the barony of Middle Third, and part of the parish of New Inn and Knockgraffon in the Roman Catholic Archdiocese of Cashel and Emly.

Location and access
It is located in the Golden Vale midway between the market and tourist towns of Cahir and Cashel. Bypassed in October 2007 by the M8, the main road through the village is a section of the R639. Two other roads, the R687 to Clonmel and the L3121 road to Golden, begin at the centre of the village.

Amenities and facilities
New Inn has two pubs, two schools, one shop, a convent and church, a Community Centre, a tennis club, and a GAA pitch, which is home to Rockwell Rovers GAA Club. To the south of the village is Outrath Co-op, which serves the large agricultural hinterland of the village.

History
The village lies within the townland of Loughkent and the village was formerly known by this name. It is derived . Older anglicisations include Lochken and Loghkean. Another old name for the village was Graigkent (likely ).

The Whiteboys
The area around present-day New Inn was a hotbed of agrarian unrest and Whiteboy activity in the late 1700s.

The road through New Inn
It is not known when the present settlement of New Inn was founded. It is not listed on either Herman Moll's 1714 map of Ireland, nor is it depicted in Taylor and Skinner's Maps of the Roads of Ireland, published in 1778. While New Inn does not appear to have existed in the 18th century, the road now known as the R639 between Cashel and Cahir clearly did. At that time the R639 was not the main Dublin to Cork route (it did not exist north of Cashel until 1739, nor south of Cahir to Fermoy until after 1811). It is probable that the present settlement developed after the turnpike road-building drive of the 18th century was substantially complete by the early 19th century, when Charles Bianconi ran regular coach services throughout the region from 1815, establishing several inns along popular routes in the process.

The Murder at Marlhill

On 22 November 1940 a local woman named Mary McCarthy (known as Moll Carthy) was murdered in a field at Marlhill. An unmarried mother of seven, McCarthy was shot in the face at close range. Her neighbour, a man named Harry Gleeson, who had discovered the body, was arrested, charged and convicted of her murder, and hanged in Dublin. The Murder at Marlhill, as the event has become known, continues to spark controversy both in the local community and historical circles, with many maintaining Gleeson's innocence. A book and two RTÉ television programmes have documented the event.

In March 2015, the Irish Justice Minister Frances Fitzgerald granted a pardon to Henry Gleeson and an apology for his hanging after a conviction that was "unsafe".

Sport
The local GAA club is Rockwell Rovers.

New Inn Tennis Club
New Inn's association with tennis goes back to the 1890s when Lena Rice of Marlhill House, New Inn came to the fore in the national tennis championships. In 1889 she was narrowly defeated in the final of the singles in Fitzwilliam Square in Dublin. She won the mixed doubles that same year, and the following year 1890 she achieved what no other Irish woman has achieved by winning the Wimbledon singles championship.

On 16 June 1991 the Lena Rice Trophy was presented to the club by Fr. Meehan on his own behalf and on behalf of David Joe O’ Neill. Each year the club invites all local clubs to play for the honour of winning this trophy.

An all weather surface was installed on both courts in February 2009. This was made possible by extensive fundraising by club members over several years and by grant aid from Tipperary County Council and National Lottery funding.

Knockgraffon

The parish of New Inn also includes Knockgraffon, a rural locality which is home to a ruined medieval church and graveyard. Knockgraffon was once a village in its own right, but the settlement was abandoned some time in the 18th century. Around 1610, the Irish historian Geoffrey Keating was appointed Parish Priest of Knockgraffon. Interesting features include a fine Motte, a church and a castle. The motte was built by the English of Leinster beside the River Suir when they were on a raid against Donal Mor O'Brien, King of Thomond, in 1192. It was given by the King to William de Braose, but later taken from him and granted to Philip of Worcester. Nearby is a ruined 13th-century nave-and-chancel church with an east window inserted in the 15th century. A few hundred yards further away is a 16th-century tower built by the Butlers.

Knockgraffon was the centre of the O'Sullivan clan's ancestral lands, until that family was displaced by the Normans in the early 13th century. In 1998, the Knockgraffon motte was purchased by an O'Sullivan (Gary Brian Sullivan of Statesboro, Georgia, US) from its Norman-Irish owner (Donal Keating of Cahir, Ireland). It is the first time that Knockgraffon has been back in O'Sullivan possession for nearly 800 years. Other townlands include: Ardneasa, Boytonrath, Chamberlainstown, Derryclooney, Garrandea, Garranlea, Lagganstown, Lough Kent, Masterstown, Marlhill, Outrath.

See also
List of towns and villages in Ireland

References

Towns and villages in County Tipperary
Middle Third, County Tipperary